Teoponte Airport is a public use airstrip serving the village of Teoponte in the La Paz Department of Bolivia. The runway is just north of Teoponte, on the south bank of the Kaka River in the eastern foothills of the Bolivian Andes. There is high terrain nearby in all quadrants.

See also

Transport in Bolivia
List of airports in Bolivia

References

External links 
OpenStreetMap - Teoponte
OurAirports - Teoponte

Airports in La Paz Department (Bolivia)